The Royal Norwegian Ministry of Climate and Environment (Norwegian: Klima- og miljødepartementet) is a Norwegian ministry established on May 8, 1972. The Ministry of Climate and Environment has a particular responsibility for carrying out the climate and environmental policies of the Government. Before 2014 the name was "Ministry of the Environment" (Norwegian: Miljøverndepartementet).

It is led by the Minister of Climate and Environment,  Espen Barth Eide (Labour Party). The department report to the legislature (Stortinget).

Organisation
The ministry is divided into the following sections:

 Department for Climate Change
 Department for Cultural Heritage Management
 Department for Marine Management and Pollution Control
 Department for Nature Management 
 Department for Organizational Affairs
 Department for Planning
 Information section
 Political staff

Political staff
 State Secretary Maren Hersleth Holsen (Liberal Party)
 State Secretary Mathias Fischer (Liberal Party)
 Political Adviser Even Aronsen (Liberal Party)

Subsidiaries
Under the ministry there are five administrative agencies

Norwegian Directorate for Environment
Norwegian Directorate for Cultural Heritage
Norwegian Polar Institute
Norwegian Mapping Authority
Norwegian Cultural Heritage Fund
Norwegian Meteorological Institute

See also
List of Norwegian Ministers of the Environment

References

External links
 Official web site

 
Environment
Norway
1972 establishments in Norway
Norway, Ministry of the Environment
Norway